Jaswant Singh ki chhatri (or Jaswant ki chatri) is a domed pillared pavilion shaped cenotaph, common to Rajasthani architecture, built in , and is said to be the only monument to have been built by a Hindu in Agra during the Mughal era. The chhatri is situated in Rajwara, Balkeshwar along the banks of river Yamuna, in Agra, and is now maintained by Archaeological Survey of India (ASI) as a monument of National importance

History
The chhatri was built in 1644-58 AD, dedicated to Rani Hada, princess of Bundi in Rajasthan who was married to Amar Singh Rathore. Amar Singh Rathore was killed on 25 July 1644 at Agra Fort. His body was given to widow Hada Rani who committed sati at the spot. Raja Jaswant Singh, younger brother of Amar Singh Rathore built this commemorative Chhatri.

The chhatri is not of Raja Jaswant Singh II who died and was cremated at Jamrud, Khyber pass in 1678. Later, his chhatri was built at Mandor in Jodhpur, known as Jaswant Thada

Architecture
The chattri is a unique feature of Rajput architecture, a feature mostly seen in Shekhawati areas of Rajasthan. Surrounded by a rectangular baradari, the structure with twelve pillars of red sandstone is known for Jali (mesh work in stone). The stone work is similar to that at Agra Fort and is popularly known as Agra Jali.

References

External links
 Protected monuments in Agra at Archaeological Survey of India (ASI)

Tourist attractions in Agra
History of Uttar Pradesh
Buildings and structures in Agra
History of Rajasthan
Monuments and memorials in Uttar Pradesh
Cenotaphs in India